Jodi Balfour (born October 29, 1986) is a South African film and television actress, known for her role as Gladys Witham in the Canadian television drama series Bomb Girls and Ellen Waverly Wilson in the Apple TV+ space drama series For All Mankind.

Early life and education 
Balfour grew up in Cape Town, South Africa. She was the co-host of the South African youth television series Bling in the early 2000s. She later studied drama at the University of Cape Town and competed in the Miss South Africa 2008 pageant.

Career 

Since her graduation in 2009, she has worked as an actor primarily in British and Canadian film and television productions.

She was cast as Gladys Witham in the Canadian television drama series Bomb Girls in 2013. She won a Canadian Screen Award for Best Lead Actress in a Television Film or Miniseries at the 3rd Canadian Screen Awards in 2015 for her performance in the series' follow-up television film Bomb Girls: Facing the Enemy.

In February 2015, she was cast in the Cinemax series Quarry.
Since 2019, she has starred in the Apple TV+ space drama series For All Mankind.

In April 2022, she was cast in the Apple TV+ soccer sitcom Ted Lasso.

Personal life 

Balfour is based in Vancouver, British Columbia, where in addition to her acting she is co-owner of a coffeehouse in the city's Gastown neighbourhood.

On 30 June 2021, she announced on Instagram that she identifies as queer, stating that she found it freeing to "finally embrace and explore [her] queerness." On 24 October 2021, Balfour announced on Instagram that she and Abbi Jacobson had been romantically involved for a year. As of August 2022, Balfour and Jacobson are engaged.

Filmography

Film

Television

Awards and nominations

References

External links

1986 births
Living people
South African film actresses
South African television actresses
South African emigrants to Canada
Actresses from Cape Town
Alumni of Rustenburg School for Girls
University of Cape Town alumni
Queer actresses
Canadian LGBT actors
South African LGBT actors